Clara Nordström, maiden name and pseudonym for Clara Elisabet von Vegesack, (January 18, 1886 in Karlskrona, Sweden – February 7, 1962 in Mindelheim, West Germany) was a German writer and translator of Swedish descent. With the themes of her writing and her Swedish maiden name she profited from the German interest for Scandinavian writers.

Biography
Born the daughter of a physician and a peasant woman in Karlskrona and brought up in Växjö (Sweden), she was bed-ridden owing to illness up to her twelfth year. It was only after that, from about 1897, that she started to frequent various private schools in Växjö. In 1903, she went to Hildesheim (Germany) and shortly afterwards to Braunschweig (Germany) in order to learn the German language. On April 17, 1905 she married, in Växjö, the son of her teacher, 15 years her senior, and in 1906 gave birth to their son Gustav Adolf. She got divorced in 1909 after she had been left by her husband. Nordström returned to Växjö for a short time and in the same year moved to Berlin to become a photographer. After three years of instruction and practical training, she had to give up her profession for health reasons. In 1912 she went to Munich to become a writer. It was there that in 1914 she met Siegfried von Vegesack, whom she married on February 16 in Stockholm.

In 1916, she moved with her husband to Berlin, where in April 1917 her daughter Isabel was born (who died in 2005). Because of an ailment of Siegfried von Vegesack's, the family in 1917 moved to a farm near Dingolfing and later to Großwalding near Deggendorf. In 1918 they acquired a corn tower near Regen, which they refurbished into a residential tower. In 1920 Karin their second daughter was born but died only a few days later. In 1923 their son Gotthard was born, to be killed in action in the Second World War in 1944. In the same year Nordström published her first novel Tomtelilla both in Germany and in Sweden. With her mother's death an important source of income had run dry. Therefore, Nordström opened up, in the tower, a place for artists and writers to live. In these years the couple started gradually to grow apart. In 1929 the family moved to Switzerland. Shortly afterwards Clara Nordström moved with her children to Stuttgart and got a divorce in 1935 at Vegesack's wish. In that year she started to read from her works all over Germany. Her 1933 novel Kajsa Lejondahl was successful.

From her German base, she also wrote articles in the Swedish Nazi press. In 1936 she returned for a short period to the residential tower in Weißenstein near Regen and in 1938/39 she built a house in Baiersbronn in the Black Forest. In 1944 she was called to Königsberg to read from her texts for the radio station run by the German Propagandaministerium transmitting in Swedish, but in 1944 had to flee to Hamburg.

Throughout her life, she again and again had to struggle with severe ailments and therefore intensely questioned her faith, which is what the characters in her books do. In 1948 she converted from Protestantism to Catholicism. Round about 1950 she again moved to Stuttgart and took orders ("Oblatin" of St. Benedict) in the convent of Neresheim. In 1952 she settled in Dießen on Lake Ammersee to be able to read from her works in Bavaria. She died in 1962 and was buried in Mindelheim.

Publications
 Tomtelilla, 1923 (enlarged edition 1953)
 Kajsa Lejondahl, 1933
 Frau Kajsa, 1934
 Roger Björn, 1935
 Lillemor, 1936
 Der Ruf der Heimat, 1938
 Bengta, die Bäuerin aus Skane, 1941
 Sternenreiter, 1946 (from 1951 published by a different publisher under the name Engelbrecht Engelbrechtsson)
 Die letzte der Svenske, 1952
 Licht zwischen den Wolken, 1952
 Kristof, 1955
 Der Weg in das große Leuchten, 1955
 Mein Leben, 1957
 Der Findling vom Sankt Erikshof, 1961
 Die Flucht nach Schweden, 1960
 Die höhere Liebe, 1963 (published after her death)

References

1886 births
1962 deaths
People from Karlskrona
German women writers
20th-century German translators
20th-century German women
Swedish emigrants to Germany